Middle Wallop is a village in the civil parish of Nether Wallop in Hampshire, England, on the A343 road. At the 2011 Census the population was included in the civil parish of Over Wallop.  The village has a public house, The George Inn, and a petrol station as well as The Wallops Parish Hall.

The Wallops
Together the villages of Over Wallop, Middle Wallop and Nether Wallop are known as The Wallops and run in a line roughly north to south following the course of the Wallop Brook, which has its source in Over Wallop.

Middle Wallop airfield
To the East of the villages the area is dominated by the Middle Wallop airfield, home to the Army Air Corps, a branch of the British Army. It was supposedly the site of a battle between certain Vitalinus, possibly Vortigern, and Aurelius Ambrosius.

References

External links

The Wallops web site

Test Valley
Villages in Hampshire